"Come What May" (aka "The Gipsy Song") is a popular song, with lyrics by Allen Schiller and music by Al Sanchez. It was popularized by Patti Page in 1952.

The Page recording was issued by Mercury Records as catalog number 5772 (backed with "Retreat"), and first reached the Billboard chart on February 9, 1952, lasting 13 weeks and peaking at number 9.

Cover versions
Helen O'Connell - a recording for Capitol Records (catalog No. 1944).
Tommy Dorsey & His Orchestra (vocal by Buddy Stark) - a single release for Decca Records in 1952.
Jimmy Scott - recorded for Coral Records (catalog No. 60650).
Lita Roza - covered the song in the UK.

References

1952 singles
1952 songs
Patti Page songs